1977 is a 2009 Indian Tamil-language action film directed by G.N.Dinesh Kumar. It stars R. Sarathkumar, Namitha and Farzana.

The film was later dubbed into Hindi as 1977: The History Re-Written in 2010.

Plot
The film begins at a fishing hamlet in Tamil Nadu where an elderly Rajashekar is worshipped as "God Father" by many. His amiable ways of living won him many friends. His son Vetrivel is an acclaimed scientist. He is received with gusto by the whole village after he returns winning awards from Central government. Unfortunately, a glance at a vernacular on a news report on Malaysia shocks Rajashekar, who immediately develops cardiac arrest and dies. Vetrivel learns of the incident and decides to unravel the mystery behind the death. He sets off to Malaysia. Vetrivel gets acquainted with a local reporter Inba, who falls for him. With her help, he finds out a disturbing truth about his father's life. Rajashekar is former police officer in Malaysia who falls to the conspiracy of a baddie and is arrested for no fault of his. Rajashekar eventually pays the price for being honest by losing his family and settles down in Tamil Nadu with his young son.

In his quest to prove that his father is innocent, Vetrivel re-opens the case and gets the help of Chandhini a lawyer who is the daughter of erstwhile public prosecutor, Gaandivan, who argued against Rajashekar 30 years ago.  He also finds his mother in the process. The rest of the movie is all but how Vetrivel rewrites history, proves his father's innocence, and avenges the bad elements.

Cast
Sarath Kumar as Rajashekar "Rasaiyya" and Vetrivel
Farzana as Inba
Namitha as Chandini
Vivek as Paraman
Jayasudha as Vetrivel's mother
Radha Ravi as Dr Sharma
Vijayakumar as DGP Padmanabhan
Ilavarasu
Shankar Siva as Criminal Lawyer

Reception
The film received mixed to negative reviews from critics. Sify stated "How long will Sarath Kumar go on doing double role as father and son? Sorry to say, the film is as avoidable as [a] migraine". Behindwoods rated 1 out of 5 and stated lackluster show. Rediff rated one-and-a-half out of five stars and stated that "1977 might have worked had it been released in 1977 and not in 2009!". The New Indian Express wrote that "One star, for Sarath Kumar, the stunts and for the sequences in Malaysia".

Soundtrack

The music was composed  by Vidyasagar. Lyrics were written by Pa. Vijay, Na. Muthukumar and Jayantha.

Tracklist 

1. "Arabi Kadal" - Sunitha Sarathy - Pa. Vijay

2. "Hawai Theevil" - KK, Sowmya Raoh - Pa. Vijay

3. "Ore Oru" - Krithika, Vijay Yesudas - Pa. Vijay

4. "Vangha Kadal" - Shankar Mahadevan - Na. Muthukumar

5. "Yenathu Uyire" - Madhu Balakrishnan, Sadhana Sargam - Jayantha

References

External links 

2009 films
Films set in 1977
2000s Tamil-language films
Films about the education system in India
Films scored by Vidyasagar